Leslie Isben Rogge (born March 8, 1940) is an American criminal and bank robber. He became the first criminal in the FBI's Ten Most Wanted to be caught due to the Internet.

Biography 
Rogge was born in Seattle, Washington.

Rogge was imprisoned at the United States Penitentiary in Leavenworth, Kansas, in the 1970s for car theft and grand larceny. He was later convicted and sentenced to 25 years for a 1984 bank robbery in Key Largo, Florida. In September 1985, he bribed a corrections officer and escaped from prison in Moscow, Idaho.

Following his escape, he went on to commit additional bank robberies, including one at an Exchange Bank branch in El Dorado, Arkansas, and at a bank in High Point, North Carolina, in 1986. On January 24, 1990, Rogge became the 430th Fugitive to be added to the FBI Ten Most Wanted Fugitives list, where he remained for the next six years. He was featured on the television program Unsolved Mysteries and on America's Most Wanted five times. In 1991, he also robbed a bank in Webb City, Missouri.

Rogge's approach involved determining which bank would be a more viable option for carrying out a robbery and meticulously planning an escape plan by deciding in which vehicle would be fastest to escape. When Rogge and his partner robbed a particular bank, they used the police scanner to monitor the state of the bank's alarm system and keep track of police activity. Meanwhile, Rogge would walk calmly and wait. When they escaped, a timed smoke bomb set the previous night would explode, providing a distraction for their escape.

On May 19, 1996, Rogge surrendered at the United States Embassy in Guatemala, after Guatemalan authorities had launched a manhunt upon being tipped off by someone who saw Rogge's photo on the FBI website. While on the run, he spent time in Antigua Guatemala, where he went by the name "Bill Young".

Rogge stole more than $2 million and robbed approximately 30 banks in all, and is currently serving a 65-year sentence at Federal Correctional Institution, Sheridan in Sheridan, Oregon. He cannot be released until 2047, when he will be 107.

References 

1940 births
20th-century American criminals
American bank robbers
American escapees
Escapees from United States federal government detention
Living people
People from Seattle
Prisoners and detainees of Texas
American expatriates in Guatemala